Barhapur is a town and a nagar panchayat in Bijnor district in the Indian state of Uttar Pradesh.

Demographics
 India census, Barhapur had a population of 20,863. Males constitute 52% of the population and females 48%. Barhapur has an average literacy rate of 38%, lower than the national average of 59.5%: male literacy is 44%, and female literacy is 31%. In Barhapur, 21% of the population is under 6 years of age.

References

Cities and towns in Bijnor district